Xavier Roe (born 13 December 1998) is a New Zealand rugby union player who plays for the  in Super Rugby. His playing position is scrum-half. He was named in the Chiefs squad for the 2021 Super Rugby Aotearoa season. He was also a member of the  2020 Mitre 10 Cup squad.

Reference list

External links
itsrugby.co.uk profile

1998 births
New Zealand rugby union players
Living people
Rugby union scrum-halves
Taranaki rugby union players
Waikato rugby union players
Chiefs (rugby union) players